Building Design, or BD, is a British weekly architectural magazine, based in London.

BD was launched in 1969 by publisher Morgan Grampian as a closed circulation weekly at a time when high-tech architecture was just starting to take off. It ceased its print edition in March 2014, becoming a digital-only publication.

Unlike most other architectural publications, BDs editors and staff are mainly journalists rather than architects. The magazine is free to subscribers and offers limited free access to non-subscribers. It is funded by revenue from advertising.

Circulation
In 2006, the last year of the independent ABC circulation reports, the magazine had a circulation of over 23,000, with 21,500 circulated free to professional and industry-related subscriptions.

By 2013, BD reportedly had a circulation of 7,698. Its website, bdonline.co.uk, has 89,000 registered users and receives around 45,000 unique visitors a week, who generate over 750,000 page impressions a month. BD’s circulation figures are independently assured by PricewaterhouseCoopers.

The magazine stopped free access to news, blogs and video content on its website in September 2010 when it introduced a subscription for full access.

The publishing company is UBM Built Environment, a division of UBM plc, which also publishes Building and Property Week.

AYA and YAYA
BD hosts the Architect of the Year Awards and Young Architect of the Year in central London, attended by approximately 6000 guests.

The Architect of the Year Awards reward the UK's top architectural practices behind excellent built projects. Since their launch in 2004, the awards have grown in size and stature, featuring entries and attendance from leading practices, and have become firmly established as a key event in the architectural calendar. The awards night is now one of the largest gatherings of architects in the UK.

The Young Architect of the Year Award recognises and rewards Europe's most promising new architects and practices. Previous winners have included Coffey Architects, Jonathan Hendry, Serie Architects, David Kohn Architects, Hackett Hall McKnight, Carmody Groarke, Nord and Lynch Architects.

World Architecture 100

BD publishes an annual ranking of the world's biggest architecture practices known as the World Architecture 100. The listing is distributed to the top FTSE 100 companies as well as BD subscribers and is available to buy online.

Carbuncle Cup
The Carbuncle Cup was BD'''s annual prize for the worst new architecture in the UK. It ran from 2006-2018, and was launched as a humorous counterpart to the Stirling Prize.

A shortlist was announced each summer, based on nominations from the public. The winner was selected by a small group of architecture critics and professionals.

Recent winners
, the winners were:
2018 – Redrock Stockport, Stockport, Greater Manchester, by BDP
2017 – Nova Victoria, City of Westminster, London, by PLP Architecture
2016 – Lincoln Plaza, Isle of Dogs, London, by Hamiltons Architects
2015 – 20 Fenchurch Street (the 'Walkie Talkie'), City of London, by Rafael Viñoly
2014 – Woolwich Central, London, by Sheppard Robson
2013 – 465 Caledonian Road, London, by Stephen George and Partners
2012 – Cutty Sark Renovation, Greenwich, London, by Grimshaw Architects
2011 – MediaCityUK, Salford, by Fairhurst, Chapman Taylor and Wilkinson Eyre
2010 – Strata, Elephant and Castle, London, by BFLS
2009 – Liverpool Ferry Terminal, Liverpool, by Hamilton Architects
2008 – Radisson SAS Waterfront Hotel, Saint Helier, Jersey, by EPR Architects
2007 – Opal Court, Leicester, by Stephen George and Partners
2006 – Drake Circus Shopping Centre, Plymouth, by Chapman Taylor

Staff
The Editor is Thomas Lane, who joined BD in 2014 from Building. The assistant editor is Elizabeth Hopkirk. The architecture critic is Ike Ijeh.

Past editors and staff include Amanda Baillieu, Paul Finch, Peter Murray, Martin Pawley, Hugh Pearman and Kieran Long.

CampaignsBuilding Design'' campaigned with the Twentieth Century Society for Robin Hood Gardens, a housing estate in Poplar, London, designed by Alison and Peter Smithson, to be listed and retained. It has likewise argued against the unnecessary demolition of old school buildings.

References

External links

Architecture magazines
Business magazines published in the United Kingdom
Defunct magazines published in the United Kingdom
Design magazines
Magazines established in 1969
Magazines disestablished in 2014
Magazines published in London
Online magazines with defunct print editions
Online magazines published in the United Kingdom
Weekly magazines published in the United Kingdom